Khanqah-E-Tajushshariah is a tomb of Akhtar Raza Khan Azhari which is a monument located near Dargah-e-Ala Hazrat in Bareilly city of Uttar Pradesh state, India.  He was the first Sunnah of the 20th century, had millions of followers around the world.

According to the Islamic Research Center study report, Azhari was "the only cleric in India to receive the title of 'Tajushshariah' and one of the few prominent figures from around the world who were allowed inside the Kaaba in Mecca. In 2014 edition of the Royal Islamic Strategic Studies Centre he was ranked 22nd in the list of 500 most influential Muslims in the world by the Center of Studies.

Events
Urs-e-Tajushshariyah was celebrated with great simplicity due to Corona virus, under the banner of All India Tanzeem Ulama-e-Islam organized by Maulana Shahabuddin Razvi has been celebrated in different states and cities of the country  Haji Shakil Qureshi released Rasayle Tajushshariyah book.

See also
 Bareilly Sharif Dargah
 Akhtar Raza Khan
 Ahmed Raza khan
 Ibrahim Raza khan
 Tauqeer Raza khan
 Subhan Raza khan
 Mustafa Raza khan
 Noumahla Masjid

Reference 

1943 births
2018 deaths
Indian muftis
20th-century Muslim scholars of Islam
21st-century Muslim scholars of Islam
Sunni Muslim scholars of Islam
Barelvis
People from Bareilly
Grand Muftis of India
Akhtar
Indian people of Pashtun descent
Al-Azhar University alumni